Casino Theatre or Casino Theater may refer to:
 Casino Theatre (Toronto), a burlesque theatre
 Casino Theatre (Copenhagen) (1848–1937)
 Casino Theatre (San Diego)
 Casino Theatre (New York City) (1882–1930)
 Earl Carroll Theatre or Casino Theatre, a Broadway theatre
 Casino Theatre (Mount Pocono, Pennsylvania)
 Casino Theatre (Gunnison, Utah)